Colchicum luteum, the yellow colchicum, is a species of flowering plant in the family Colchicaceae, native to Central Asia, Afghanistan, Pakistan, the western Himalayas, and Tibet. The only yellow-flowered member of its genus, a number of cultivars are available, including 'Golden Baby' and 'Vahsh'.

References

luteum
Flora of Central Asia
Flora of Afghanistan
Flora of Pakistan
Flora of West Himalaya
Flora of Tibet
Plants described in 1874